Goodleigh is a village about 1 km northeast of Bodmiscombe in the county of Devon, England.

The origin of the place-name is from the Old English words Goda  and leah meaning a woodland clearing of a man named Goda.

References

 

Villages in Devon